Belle Prairie Township is located in Livingston County, Illinois in the United States. As of the 2010 census, its population was 135 and it contained 55 housing units.

History
Hoffman, M. M., & Hieronymus, D. J. (2002). Potosi, a ghost town and the Fairview community. Place of publication not identified: publisher not identified. A history of communities in the Belle Prairie township.
Potosi a ghost town and Fairview Community

Geography

Demographics

References

External links
US Census
City-data.com
Illinois State Archives

Townships in Livingston County, Illinois
Populated places established in 1857
Townships in Illinois
1857 establishments in Illinois